Banco del Mutuo Soccorso is the eponymous debut album by Italian progressive rock band Banco del Mutuo Soccorso.
The cover of the original vinyl was shaped like a piggy bank; a slit was extracted from a strip of cardboard with the faces of the members of the group. The image on the cover is by illustrator Mimmo Mellino.

Track listing

Music by Vittorio Nocenzi. Lyrics by Vittorio Nocenzi and Francesco Di Giacomo.

Personnel

 Vittorio Nocenzi – Organ, Harpsichord, clarino, vocals
 Gianni Nocenzi – Piano, E-flat clarinet, vocals
 Marcello Todaro – Electric guitar, acoustic guitar, vocals
 Renato D'Angelo – Bass
 Pier Luigi Calderoni – drums
 Francesco Di Giacomo – Lead vocals

References

1972 debut albums
Banco del Mutuo Soccorso albums